Larionovo is a rural locality (a village) in Fominskoye Rural Settlement, Sheksninsky District, Vologda Oblast, Russia. The population was 157 as of 2002.

Geography 
Larionovo is located 55 km southeast of Sheksna (the district's administrative centre) by road. Fomisnkoye is the nearest rural locality.

References 

Rural localities in Sheksninsky District
Vologodsky Uyezd